Chris Dickens (born February, 1967) is a British film and television editor.  For his work on Slumdog Millionaire (2008), directed by Danny Boyle, he won the Academy Award for Best Film Editing, the BAFTA Award for Best Editing, and the American Cinema Editors Award for Best Edited Feature Film – Dramatic.

Chris went to Hailsham Community College in his teenage years and  graduated from Arts University Bournemouth in 1990.  He worked in television for a number of years, including a stint with the director Edgar Wright on the television series Spaced. Dickens subsequently edited Wright's first feature film, Shaun of the Dead (2004). He worked again with Wright on Hot Fuzz (2007).

Dickens' editing of Slumdog Millionaire has been discussed by several critics. Peter Caranicas wrote, "'Slumdog' has a complex structure that interweaves three story strands into a single braid, yielding a rich, almost fugal narrative." In May 2017, after over three months of shooting, Dickens was replaced as the editor of the film Solo: A Star Wars Story, which was released in May 2018.

Selected filmography

References

External links

Living people
Alumni of Arts University Bournemouth
British film editors
English television editors
Best Editing BAFTA Award winners
Best Film Editing Academy Award winners
1967 births